Schleesen is a village and a former municipality in Wittenberg district in Saxony-Anhalt, Germany. Since 1 January 2010, it is part of the town Kemberg.

Geography 
Schleesen lies about 15 km southwest of Lutherstadt Wittenberg on the edge of the Flusslandschaft Mittlere Elbe biosphere reserve.

Subdivisions
Schleesen has two of these: Naderkau and Bräunigk.

History 
Schleesen had its first documentary mention on 12 December 1200 under the name Selezne in a document from the monastery at Wörlitz. The church was built about 1250.

Regular events 
The Rosenfest is held yearly on the third weekend in July.

Economy and transportation
Schleesen lies on the L 132 state road from Oranienbaum-Wörlitz to Radis and on district road (Kreisstraße) K2040 from Selbitz to Schleesen. Federal Highway (Bundesstraße) B 107 between Gräfenhainichen and Coswig is about 6 km away, and the B 100 between Gräfenhainichen and Wittenberg is about 5 km away. The Autobahn interchange with Bundesautobahn 9, Dessau-Ost, is about 12 km away.

The nearest railway station is found at Radis on the line between Wittenberg and Bitterfeld.

Personalities 
Richard Bartmuß (born 23 December 1859; died 1910), was a German composer.

External links 
Verwaltungsgemeinschaft's website

Former municipalities in Saxony-Anhalt
Kemberg